The Xujiang Xiaowo Stone Inscription is an epigraphy in Jincheng Township, Kinmen County, Taiwan.

History
During the Ming Dynasty under Jiajing Emperor, Yu Dayou was appointed as the battalion commander and assigned to guard Kinmen. During his term, he was inspired to recite poet. He engraved the words Xujiang Xiaowo on a big boulder. When his deputy commander Yang Hongju took over the task to guard Kinmen, Yang engraved the words Dizhu on nearby rocks. He also built a pavilion in front of the boulder and hung the inscription Houle which was then known as the Xiaowo Pavilion. The pavilion was then once destroyed but was soon restored.

In 1728, a garrison commander Lu Ruilin inscribed the words Ruhua on the left of Yang's epitaph. Zhujie of Yanshan inscribed the words Daguan at the higher part. To the right of Yang's epitaph, there are the words Guanhai. There are also two poems engraved on the stone tablets made by Ding Yizhong and Xu Nanfeng during their visit to Kinmen and a chronicle of Xiaowo Pavilion made by Yang Hongju.

See also
 List of tourist attractions in Taiwan

References

Buildings and structures in Kinmen County
Epigraphy
Jincheng Township